This is a list of ministers from Pema Khandu cabinets starting from 17 July 2016. Pema Khandu is the leader of INC, who was sworn in the Chief Minister of Arunachal Pradesh on  17 July 2016 as INC's Chief Minister.

Chief Minister & Cabinet Ministers

Former Ministers 

 Jomde Kena - Minister of Transport, Supply and Transport, Legal Metrology and Consumer Affairs
 Rajesh Tacho - Minister of Animal Husbandry and Veterinary, Diary Development, Fisheries
 Tanga Byaling - Minister of Rural Development, Panchayat
 Takam Pario - Minister of Public Health Engineering, Disaster Management

See also 

 Government of Arunachal Pradesh
 Arunachal Pradesh Legislative Assembly
 Kalikho Pul cabinet

References

Bharatiya Janata Party state ministries
2016 in Indian politics
Arunachal Pradesh ministries

2016 establishments in Arunachal Pradesh
Cabinets established in 2016
Cabinets disestablished in 2019
2019 disestablishments in India